Titini (Aymara titi Andean mountain cat; lead, -ni a suffix to indicate ownership, "the one with the Andean cat" or "the one with lead", also spelled Titine) is a mountain in the Andes of southern Peru, about  high. It is located in the Moquegua Region, Mariscal Nieto Province, Carumas District, and in the Tacna Region, Candarave Province, Candarave District.

References

Mountains of Moquegua Region
Mountains of Tacna Region
Mountains of Peru